Matthew Xia (born 1982) is a British theatre director, DJ (under the name DJ Excalibah), composer, broadcaster and journalist.

Early life
Xia was born to a Scottish and English mother and Jamaican father in Waltham Forest, London, and was raised in Leytonstone and Newham.

Theatrical career
Xia's interest in theatre was encouraged when he joined the Theatre Royal Stratford East youth theatre. As a young actor he appeared in Tube Tale's Mouth directed by Armando Iannucci.

Xia was on the Board at the Theatre Royal Stratford East for 10 years, as well as being Associate Director there in 2009/2010. Work here includes: I was looking at the ceiling and then I saw the sky, Mad Blud, Re:Definition, Da Boyz (also musical director and composer), and as co-director Aladdin, Cinderella and The Blacks (also musical director and composer).

Xia was a founding member of Act For Change, a trustee for Artistic Directors of the Future and has served on the boards of Rich Mix (2008-2012) and Creative Futures.

In 2013, he was the recipient of the Regional Theatre Young Director Scheme bursary and took up the post as Director in Residence at the Liverpool Everyman and Playhouse Theatres, where he directed the premiere of Daniel Matthew’s Scrappers and was Associate Director of the Everyman's opening ceremony.

In 2013, he won the Young Vic’s Genesis Future Director award with his production of Sizwe Banzi is Dead, which sold out its six-week run at the Young Vic and was then followed by a six-week national tour. He also directed the revival of Joe Penhall's Blue/Orange for the Young Vic in 2015 starring David Haig, Daniel Kaluuya and Luke Norris. From 2014-17 he was Associate Artistic Director at the Manchester Royal Exchange where he directed the Bruntwood Award-winning Wish List by Katherine Soper, Stephen Sondheim's Into the Woods and Frankenstein adapted by April de Angelis.

Xia was a member of the panel of judges for the Bruntwood Prize for Playwriting 2017 alongside: Alfred Enoch, Lucy Prebble, Russell T. Davies, Lyndsey Turner, Michael Oglesby, Phil Porter, and chair Kirsty Lang. He was also a judge for the 2017 Alfred Fagon Award.

Selected theatre productions

 2004 Da Boyz by Rodgers & Hart at Theatre Royal Stratford East.
 2007 The Blacks by Jean Genet at Theatre Royal Stratford East.
 2011 I was looking at the ceiling and then I saw the sky by John Adams and June Jordan at Theatre Royal Stratford East.
 2013 Sizwe Banzi is Dead by Athol Fugard, John Kani and Winston Ntshona at the Young Vic.
 2015 Into The Woods by Stephen Sondheim at the Manchester Royal Exchange.
 2015 Blue/Orange by Joe Penhall at the Young Vic.
 2016 Wish List by Katherine Soper. Joint production between the Manchester Royal Exchange and the Royal Court Theatre.
 2018 Frankenstein by Mary Shelley adapted by April De Angelis at the Manchester Royal Exchange.
2018 Shebeen by Mufaro Makubika

DJ Excalibah
Formerly a DJ on BBC Radio 1Xtra where he presented his show, 'Tales From the Legend' until 2005, in 2012 during the parade at the 2012 Summer Paralympics opening ceremony, he presented a mix of global music along with DJ Walde and Goldierocks. He has DJed at the Glastonbury Festival, Ministry of Sound, Fabric and clubs across Europe and the UK. His other broadcast work includes BBC Radio 1, 6Music and Radio 4.

Journalism
Xia has written for The Stage, Hip Hop Connection, The Sunday Telegraph and The Guardian.

References

Living people
1982 births
Black British radio presenters
People from the London Borough of Newham
British DJs
English people of Jamaican descent
English people of Scottish descent
BBC Radio 1Xtra presenters
English theatre directors
The Guardian journalists